William James Johnson (November 18, 1881 – April 16, 1949) was a Canadian politician. He served in the Legislative Assembly of British Columbia from 1945 to 1949  from the electoral district of Revelstoke, a member of the Coalition government.

References

1881 births
1949 deaths